Halle (Saale), or simply Halle (from the 15th to the 17th century: Hall in Sachsen; until the beginning of the 20th century: Halle an der Saale ; from 1965 to 1995: Halle/Saale) is the largest city of the German state of Saxony-Anhalt, the fifth most populous city in the area of former East Germany after (East) Berlin, Leipzig, Dresden and Chemnitz, as well as the 31st largest city of Germany, and with around 239,000 inhabitants, it is slightly more populous than the state capital of Magdeburg. Together with Leipzig, the largest city of Saxony, Halle forms the polycentric Leipzig-Halle conurbation. Between the two cities, in Schkeuditz, lies Leipzig/Halle International Airport. The Leipzig-Halle conurbation is at the heart of the larger Central German Metropolitan Region.

Halle lies in the south of Saxony-Anhalt, in the Leipzig Bay, the southernmost part of the North German Plain, on the River Saale (a tributary of the Elbe), which is the third longest river flowing entirely in Germany after the Weser and the Main. The White Elster flows into the Saale in the southern borough of Silberhöhe. Halle is the fourth largest city in the Thuringian-Upper Saxon dialect area after Leipzig, Dresden and Chemnitz.

Halle is an economic and educational center in central Germany. The Martin Luther University of Halle-Wittenberg, with campuses in Halle and Wittenberg, is the largest university in Saxony-Anhalt, one of the oldest universities in Germany, and a nurturing ground for the local startup ecosystem. The German National Academy of Sciences, commonly known as Leopoldina, has its seat in Halle. The university hospital of Halle (Universitätsklinikum Halle (Saale)) is the largest hospital in the state.

Geography
Halle (Saale) is located in the southern part of Saxony-Anhalt in central Germany, along the river Saale which drains the surrounding plains and the greater part of the neighbouring Free State of Thuringia just to its south, and the Thuringian basin, northwards from the Thuringian Forest.

Climate
Köppen climate classification classifies its climate as oceanic (Cfb). However, it is close to being a cold semi-arid climate (BSk) or hot semi-arid climate (BSh), depending on whether mean annual temperature isotherm or mean temperature in the coldest month isotherm is applied. Using the most current climate data from April 2017 to March 2022, the annual precipitation is 17 mm too much to be classified as a cold or hot semi-arid climate. For example, using the climate data from September 2015 to August 2020, the climate would fulfill the requirements to be classified as a cold or hot semi-arid climate. Notwithstanding, the great variation of annual precipitation between the years allows agriculture and large trees to grow, surviving recurring drought periods and years like in the summers of 2018 and 2019 with severe drought because of regularly occurring wet periods and years and absence of extremely hot temperatures with never reaching . With its vegetation, Halle is far from the steppe or semi-desert vegetation typical of hot or cold semi-arid climates.

History

Name
Halle's early history is connected with the harvesting of salt. The name of the river Saale contains the Germanic root for salt, and salt-harvesting has taken place in Halle since at least the Bronze Age (2300–600 BC).

From 1965 to 1995, the official name was Halle/Saale.

Middle Ages until industrialisation 
The earliest documented mention of Halle dates from AD 806. It became a part of the Archbishopric of Magdeburg in the 10th century and remained so until 1680, when the Margraviate of Brandenburg annexed it together with Magdeburg as the Duchy of Magdeburg, while it was an important location for Martin Luther's Reformation in the 16th century. Cardinal Albert of Mainz (Archbishop of Magdeburg from 1513 to 1545) also impacted on the town in this period. According to historic documents, the city of Halle became a member of the Hanseatic League at least as early as 1281.

Halle became a center for Pietism, a movement encouraged by King Frederick William I of Prussia (reigned 1713–1740) because it caused the area's large Lutheran population to be more inclined to Fredrick William I's religion (Calvinism), as well as more loyal to the Prussian king instead of to the decentralized feudal system. By the 1740s Halle had established many orphanages as well as schools for the wealthy in the sober style Pietism encouraged. This Halle education was the first time the "modern education" system was established. The Halle Pietists also combatted poverty.

During the War of the Fourth Coalition, French and Prussian forces clashed in the Battle of Halle on 17 October 1806. The fighting moved from the covered bridges on the city's west side, through the streets and market place, to the eastern suburbs.

In 1815 Halle became part of the Prussian Province of Saxony.

World War II (1939–1945)

During World War II, KZ-Außenlager Birkhahn, a subcamp of Buchenwald was in Halle, where prisoners from Poland, Czechoslovakia, the Soviet Union, France, Netherlands and other nations were forced to work in the Siebel aircraft plants, making combat aircraft. The plant was later dismantled. In Ammendorf, a large factory owned by  produced mustard gas.

Near the end of World War II, there were two bombing raids carried out against the town: the first on 31 March 1945, the second a few days later. The first attack took place between the railway station and the city's centre, and the second bombing was in the southern district. It killed over 1,000 inhabitants and destroyed 3,600 buildings. Among them, the Market Church, St. George Church, the Old Town Hall, the municipal theatre, historic buildings on Bruederstrasse and on Grosse Steinstrasse, and the city cemetery.

On 17 April 1945, American soldiers occupied Halle, and the Red Tower was set on fire by artillery and destroyed. The Market Church and the Church of St. George received more hits. However, the city was spared further damage because an aerial bombardment was canceled, after former naval officer Felix von Luckner negotiated the city's surrender to the American army. In July, the Americans withdrew and the city was occupied by the Red Army.

German Democratic Republic (1949–1990)
After World War II, Halle served as the capital of the short-lived administrative region of Saxony-Anhalt until 1952, when the East German government abolished its "Länder" (states). As a part of East Germany (until 1990), it functioned as the capital of the administrative district (Bezirk) of Halle.

Since German unity (after 1990)
When Saxony-Anhalt was re-established as a Bundesland in 1990, Magdeburg, not Halle, became the capital.

On 9 October 2019, two people were killed in a shooting incident at a synagogue in Halle. The Federal Prosecutor (Generalbundesanwalt) classified the attack as an act of right-wing terrorism stemming from antisemitism; as a consequence security measures at Jewish facilities were increased.

Population

Population of foreign residents:

Politics

Mayor

The current mayor of Halle is independent politician Bernd Wiegand since 2012. The most recent mayoral election was held on 13 October 2019, with a runoff held on 27 October, and the results were as follows:

! rowspan=2 colspan=2| Candidate
! rowspan=2| Party
! colspan=2| First round
! colspan=2| Second round
|-
! Votes
! %
! Votes
! %
|-
| bgcolor=| 
| align=left| Bernd Wiegand
| align=left| Independent
| 35,419
| 44.3
| 41,273
| 61.4
|-
| bgcolor=| 
| align=left| Hendrik Lange
| align=left| Left/SPD/Greens
| 20,104
| 25.2
| 25,922
| 38.6
|-
| bgcolor=| 
| align=left| Andreas Silbersack
| align=left| FDP/CDU
| 18,310
| 22.9
|-
| bgcolor=| 
| align=left| Daniel Schrader
| align=left| Independent
| 1,954
| 2.5
|-
| bgcolor=| 
| align=left| Falko Kadzimirisz
| align=left| Free Voters
| 1,613
| 2.0
|-
| bgcolor=| 
| align=left| Dörte Jacobi
| align=left| Independent (PARTEI)
| 1,598
| 2.0
|-
| bgcolor=| 
| align=left| Rolf Lennart Thiemann
| align=left| Independent
| 488
| 0.6
|-
| bgcolor=| 
| align=left| Martin Bochmann
| align=left| Independent (PARTEI)
| 397
| 0.5
|-
! colspan=3| Valid votes
! 79,883
! 99.4
! 67,195
! 99.1
|-
! colspan=3| Invalid votes
! 451
! 0.6
! 625
! 0.9
|-
! colspan=3| Total
! 80,334
! 100.0
! 67,820
! 100.0
|-
! colspan=3| Electorate/voter turnout
! 189,583
! 42.4
! 189,208
! 35.8
|-
| colspan=7| Source: City of Halle (Saale)
|}

City council

The most recent city council election was held on 26 May 2019, and the results were as follows:

! colspan=2| Party
! Votes
! %
! +/-
! Seats
! +/-
|-
| bgcolor=| 
| align=left| The Left (Die Linke)
| 55,951
| 17.8
|  7.3
| 10
|  4
|-
| bgcolor=| 
| align=left| Christian Democratic Union (CDU)
| 54,831
| 17.4
|  7.7
| 10
|  4
|-

| bgcolor=| 
| align=left| Alliance 90/The Greens (Grüne)
| 51,239
| 16.3
|  6.2
| 9
|  3
|-
| bgcolor=| 
| align=left| Alternative for Germany (AfD)
| 44,028
| 14.0
|  9.4
| 8
|  5
|-
| bgcolor=| 
| align=left| Social Democratic Party (SPD)
| 35,489
| 11.3
|  7.9
| 6
|  5
|-
| 
| align=left| Priority Halle (Hauptsache)
| 21,637
| 6.9
| New
| 3
| New
|-
| bgcolor=| 
| align=left| Free Democratic Party (FDP)
| 16,904
| 5.4
|  1.1
| 3
|  1
|-
| 
| align=left| With Citizens for Halle (MitBürger)
| 14,051
| 4.5
|  1.1
| 3
| ±0
|-
| bgcolor=| 
| align=left| Die PARTEI (PARTEI)
| 10,760
| 3.4
|  2.5
| 2
|  1
|-
| bgcolor=| 
| align=left| Free Voters (FW)
| 6,568
| 2.1
|  1.4
| 1
|  1
|-
| colspan=7 bgcolor=lightgrey| 
|-
| 
| align=left| Team Schrader (Schrader)
| 2,576
| 0.8
| New
| 0
| New
|-
| bgcolor=| 
| align=left| National Democratic Party (NPD)
| 738
| 0.2
|  1.0
| 0
|  1
|-
! colspan=2| Total
! 314,722
! 100.0
! 
! 
! 
|-
! colspan=2| Valid votes
! 106,352
! 98.3
! 
! 
! 
|-
! colspan=2| Invalid votes
! 1,796
! 1.7
! 
! 
! 
|-
! colspan=2| Total
! 108,148
! 100.0
! 
! 56
! ±0
|-
! colspan=2| Electorate/voter turnout
! 191,030
! 56.6
!  16.2
! 
! 
|-
| colspan=7| Source: City of Halle (Saale)
|}

Sights

Halloren Chocolate Factory and visitors' centre, Germany's oldest chocolate factory still in use.
Giebichenstein Castle, first mentioned in 961, is north of the city centre on a hill above the Saale river, with a museum in the upper castle and the Burg Giebichenstein University of Art and Design in the lower castle.
Moritzburg, a newer castle, was built between 1484 and 1503. It was the residence of the Archbishops of Magdeburg, was destroyed in the Thirty Years' War, and was a ruin for centuries afterward. Partially reconstructed in 1901–1913, it is an art gallery today. The reconstruction was completed with the opening of new exhibition rooms designed by the Spanish architects Sobejano and Nieto in 2010.
Neue Residenz (New Residence), an early Renaissance palace (1531–1537)
Market square with
Market Church of St. Mary (Marktkirche), built in 1529–1554, using elements of two medieval churches, St. Gertrude's Church dating back to the 11th century and the older St. Mary's Church from the 12th century. The church has four steeples, the two western octagonal ones are called Blue Towers because of their dark blue slate roofing. The other two Hausmannstürme are connected by a bridge and on this bridge was the city's fire watch. The church owns the original death-mask of Martin Luther. The Marktkirche's four towers is a landmark symbol of the city.
Roter Turm (Red Tower), originally built as campanile of the older St. Mary's Church between 1418 and 1503, a landmark of Halle, with the steeples of St. Mary's Church forms the five towers marking the city's skyline.
Roland, originally (13th century) a wooden sculpture representing urban liberty (after an uprising in the city, a cage was placed around it between 1481 and 1513, a reminder of the restrictions). Today's sculpture is a sandstone replica made in 1719.
Marktschlösschen, late Renaissance building, gallery and tourist information office
Monument to George Frideric Handel, 1859 by Hermann Heidel
Ratshof (Council's Yard), built in 1928/29 as a backyard building of the Old Town Hall (demolished in 1948/50 after the destruction of World War II, so the Ratshof is situated today directly on the market square).
Stadthaus, Renaissance-Revival building of 1891–1894
Yellow line, which runs over the market square, marking a geological fault line, the Hallische Verwerfung.
Handel House, first mentioned in 1558, birthplace of George Frideric Handel, a museum since 1948
Wilhelm Friedemann Bach House, home of composer Wilhelm Friedemann Bach, now a museum
Old Market square with Donkey's Fountain (1906/13), referring to a local legend
Remains of the town fortifications: the Leipzig Tower (Leipziger Turm) (15th century) in the east and remains of the town wall to the south of the city centre.
Sculpture dedicated to Lenin in the Pestalozzi Park.
Francke Foundations, Baroque buildings (including Europe's largest surviving half-timbered building) and historical collections
Stadtgottesacker, a Renaissance cemetery, laid out in 1557, in the style of an Italian camposanto
Saline Museum is dedicated to Halle's salt-works and the corporation of salt workers (Halloren)
Cathedral (Dom), a steepleless building, was originally a church within a Dominican monastery (1271), converted into a cathedral by cardinal Albert of Hohenzollern. Since 1688, it has been the church of the Reformed parish.
Saint Maurice Church, late Gothic building (1388–1511)
Saint Ulrich Church, late Gothic church of the Servite Order (15th century), today used as a concert hall
Church of the former village of Böllberg (Romanesque, with late Gothic painted wooden ceiling)
Numerous bourgeois town houses, including the Ackerbürgerhof (15th – 18th centuries with remains from the 12th century), Christian Wolff’s House (today City Museum), Graseweg House (half-timbered building)
State Museum of Prehistory where the Nebra sky disk is exhibited
Volkspark (1906/07), former meeting house of the Social Democrats
Theatres:
Halle Opera House
Neues Theater
Puppentheather
Thalia Theater, the only theatre for children in Saxony-Anhalt
Steintor Bühne
Parks and gardens:
Botanical Garden of the Martin Luther University of Halle-Wittenberg, founded in 1698 in the former gardens of the Archbishops of Magdeburg, belonging to the Garden Dreams project
Reichardts Garten is a historic park, part of the Garden Dreams project. Laid out in 1794 by Johann Friedrich Reichardt (1752–1814) as an English garden, becoming the "accommodation of Romanticism". It changed ownership several times and the city of Halle bought the park in 1903 to give the public wider access.
Peißnitz Island
Pestalozzi Park
Zoological Garden (Bergzoo), situated on the Reilsberg hill.
Galgenberge, location of the gallows from the 14th to the end of the 18th century
Klausberge, porphyry hill, named after a chapel of the St. Nicholas' brotherhood, panoramic view over the Saale Valley, Eichendorff's bench
Dölauer Heide forest, including Bischofs Wiese with 35 graves dating back to about 2500–2000 BC, the Neolithic period
Racecourse in the Passendorf Meadows
Halle-Neustadt, to the west of Halle, built beginning 1964 (foundation stone ceremony 15 July 1964) as a socialist model city. Still has several monuments from the GDR, as a giant mural dedicated to Lenin.

Image gallery

Industrial heritage

Salt, also known as white gold, was extracted from four "Borns" (well-like structures). The four Borns/brine named Gutjahrbrunnen, Meteritzbrunnen, Deutscher Born and Hackeborn, were located around the Hallmarket (or "Under Market"), now a market square with a fountain, just across from the TV station, MDR. The brine was highly concentrated and boiled in Koten, simple structured houses made from reed and clay. Salters, who wore a unique uniform with eighteen silver buttons, were known as Halloren, and this name was later used for the chocolates in the shape of these buttons.

The Halloren-Werke, the oldest chocolate factory in Germany, was founded in 1804. Old documents are on display and a chocolate room can be visited.

Within East Germany, Halle's chemical industry, now mainly shut down, was of great importance. The two main companies in the region were Buna-Werke and Leuna, and Halle-Neustadt was built in the 1960s to accommodate the employees of these two factories.

Science and culture
Baroque composer Georg Friedrich Händel (later George Frideric Handel) was born in Halle in 1685 and spent the first 17 years of his life in the city. The house where he lived is now a museum about his life. To celebrate his music, Halle has staged a Handel Festival since 1922, annually in June since 1952.

The University of Halle was founded here in 1694. It is now combined with the University of Wittenberg and called the Martin Luther University of Halle-Wittenberg. The university's medical school was established by Friedrich Hoffmann. Its botanical garden, the Botanische Garten der Martin-Luther-Universität Halle-Wittenberg, dates back to 1698. Halle's German Academy of Sciences Leopoldina is the oldest and one of the most respected scientific societies in Germany. The seat of the Max Planck Institute for Social Anthropology, one of the world's largest social anthropological research institutions and a part of the Max Planck Society, is in Halle.

Halle was a centre of German Pietism and played an important role in establishing the Lutheran church in North America, when Henry Muhlenberg and others were sent as missionaries to Pennsylvania in the mid-18th century. Muhlenberg is now called the first Patriarch of the Lutheran Church in America. He and his son, Frederick Muhlenberg, who was the first Speaker of the United States House of Representatives, were graduates of Halle University.

The Silver Treasure of the Halloren is displayed occasionally at the Technical Museum Saline. It is a unique collection of silver and gold goblets dating back to 1266. The ancient craft of "Schausieden" (boiling of the brine) can be observed there too. The State Museum of Prehistory houses the Nebra sky disk, a significant (though unproven) Bronze-Age find with astronomical significance.

Halle Zoo contributes to the EAZA breeding programme, in particular for the Angolan lion and the Malaysian tiger. Halle is also known for its thriving coypu (or nutria) population, which is native to South America.

With writers such as Heine, Eichendorff, Schleiermacher, Tieck and Novalis the town was a vibrant scene of the German Romanticism. Also Johann Wolfgang von Goethe was a regular guest at the house of his close friend Johann Friedrich Reichardt.

German-American expressionist painter Lyonel Feininger worked in Halle on an invitation by the city from 1929 to 1931. As one of eleven views of the city termed Halle Cycle, he painted in 1931 Die Türme über der Stadt (The towers above the city), which is now in the Museum Ludwig in Cologne. This painting appeared on a 55 eurocent stamp on 5 December 2002 as a part of the series “Deutsche Malerei des 20. Jahrhunderts” (German painting of the 20th century).

Transport history
Ludwig Wucherer made Halle an important rail hub in central Germany. In 1840 he opened the Magdeburg-Halle-Leipzig line, completing a connection between Magdeburg and Dresden. From 1841 to 1860, other lines to Erfurt, Kassel and Berlin followed.

The centrepiece of Halle's urban public transport system is the Halle (Saale) tramway network. It includes the world's first major electric-powered inner-city tram line, which was opened in 1891. Halle (Saale) Hauptbahnhof is the main railway station.

Halle's prominence as a railway centre grew with the arrival of the Erfurt-Leipzig/Halle high-speed railway. Leipzig is also connected to this route, but since it is a terminus station (though the Leipzig City Tunnel is currently under construction, the route will be shared with S-Bahn trains, making it unlikely that it will be used as a through station for Berlin-Munich trains), Halle is more likely to be used as an intermediate stop for Berlin-Munich trains. The completion of the Nuremberg–Erfurt high-speed railway also provided a further impetus to use the route.

Leipzig/Halle Airport (opened in 1927) is an international airport located in Schkeuditz, Saxony, and serves both Leipzig, Saxony, and Halle, Saxony-Anhalt.  it is Germany's 11th largest airport by passengers, handling more than 2.57 million mainly with flights to European leisure destinations. In terms of cargo traffic, the airport is the fifth-busiest in Europe and the second-busiest in Germany after Frankfurt Airport.

Sports

The football team Hallescher FC Wacker 1900 had some regional importance before World War II. In the German Championship Wacker reached the semi-finals in 1921, and the quarter-finals in 1928. The successor team became East German champions in 1949 and 1952 under the names of ZSG Union and BSG Turbine Halle. From these evolved today's Turbine Halle and Hallescher FC. In the era of the German Democratic Republic, the latter club (as Chemie Halle ) was a mainstay in the first division and won the Cup tournament in 1956 and 1962. The most prominent player was 72-times international Bernd Bransch, who was with Chemie in the 1960s and 1970s. These days, Hallescher FC usually plays in the third division.

The general sports club , originating from Chemie Halle, created a notable number of Olympic gold medallists and world champions, mainly in nautical and watersports, e.g., swimmer Kornelia Ender won four Olympic gold medals in 1976 and Andreas Hajek won four rowing world championships between 1998 and 2001. The basketball team of the club – these days known as Lions and focusing on the woman's team which plays in the national first division – won five men's and 10 women's championships of the German Democratic Republic.
The Hallescher FC's location is extremely close to a train station.

Notable people

Public service 

 Clemens von Delbrück (1856–1921) conservative politician, Vice-Chancellor of Germany 1908-1916
 Helga Einsele (1910-2005) a criminologist, prison director and high-profile prisons reformer.
 Gerhard Feige (born 1951), bishop of the Roman Catholic Diocese of Magdeburg
 August Hermann Francke (1663–1727), Lutheran Pietist theologian at the University of Halle and founder of the Halle Orphan House complex.
 Hans-Dietrich Genscher (1927–2016), former Vice Chancellor and longest serving Foreign Minister, (1974 to 1992), was born in Reideburg, which belongs to Halle today
 Gerald Götting (1923–2015) chairman of the East German Christian Democratic Union, 1966-1989.
 Margot Honecker (1927–2016) First Lady of the German Democratic Republic, 1976–1989
 Friedrich Ludwig Jahn (1778–1852), theology student of University Halle 1796–1800, went into hiding using a porphyry cave along the river Saale. It became known as the "Jahn-Höhle" (Cave).
 Christian Andreas Käsebier (1710–1757), intelligence operative for Frederick the Great, robber and swindler, born and raised in Halle
 Carl Lampert, (1894–1944), priest, beheaded by Nazis in World War II at Halle
 Hans Litten (1903–1938), lawyer, represented opponents of the Nazis at trials from 1929 and 1932
 Johann David Michaelis (1717–1791) a Prussian biblical scholar and teacher.
 Frederick Muhlenberg (1750–1801), the first Speaker of the United States House of Representatives, graduated at Halle University.
 George Müller (1805–1898), preacher and philanthropist, coordinator of orphanages in Bristol.
 Cornelia Pieper (born 1959) a German politician, now German consul general in Gdańsk, Poland.
 Richard Raatzsch (born 1957), philosopher and professor of practical philosophy
 Princess Elisabeth Sophie of Saxe-Altenburg (1619–1680), a princess of Saxe-Altenburg
 Fabian von Schlabrendorff (1907–1980), lawyer, officer, judge and member of the German resistance
 Friedrich Daniel Ernst Schleiermacher (1768–1834), university preacher and professor of theology to the University of Halle, where he remained until 1807.
 Fabian von Schlabrendorff (1907–1980) a jurist, soldier and member of the German resistance and judge of the German Federal Constitutional Court.
 Albrecht Schröter (born 1955), politician (SPD) and mayor of Jena from 2006 to 2018.
 Gertrud Schubart-Fikentscher (1896-1985) first female professor of Law from 1948 for 17 years
 Ullrich Sierau (born 1956), politician (SPD) and mayor of Dortmund from 2010 to 2020
 John Sigismund, Elector of Brandenburg (1572–1619) a Prince-elector of the Margraviate of Brandenburg 
 Hans-Christian Ströbele (born 1939), politician (Greens) and member of the Bundestag
 Johann Friedrich Struensee (1737–1772) a German physician, philosopher and statesman.
 Ľudovít Štúr (1815–1856), Slovak national leader, linguist and writer, studied at the University of Halle in 1838–1840

Military 

 Max von Bahrfeldt (1856–1936), Prussian General, local historian, and world renown numismatist, died here in 1936
 Reinhard Heydrich (1904–1942), a leading Nazi in WWII and a main architect of the Holocaust
 Ludolf von Alvensleben (1901–1970) an SS functionary, fled to Argentina after WWII
 Oswald Boelcke (1891–1916), World War I German flying ace, born near Halle
 Karl von Eberstein (1894–1979) German nobility, early member of the Nazi Party, the SA and the SS.
 Walter Eisfeld (1905–1940), Nazi SS concentration camp commandant
 Paul Götze (1903–1948), Nazi SS officer at Auschwitz and Buchenwald concentration camps executed for war crimes
 Johannes Hassebroek (1910–1977), Nazi SS commandant of Gross-Rosen concentration camp.
 Karl Freiherr von Müffling (1775–1851), Prussian general field marshal.

Science 

 Bernd Baselt (1934–1993), university professor, published a catalogue leading to the modern day opus designator (HWV) which is used when referring to the works of George Frideric Handel.
 Dorothea Christiane Erxleben of Quedlinburg (1715–1762) received her Doctor of Medicine degree in 1754 from the Medical Department of Martin Luther University (MLU)
 Georg Cantor (1845–1918), mathematician and professor at the university of Halle
 Arthur Golf (1877–1941) an academic agronomist, focussed on colonial agriculture
 Siegwart Horst Günther (1925–2015), a German physician,'father of the anti-uranium-weapons movement in Germany', born in Halle
 Friedrich Hoffmann (1660–1742), a German physician and chemist.
 Christian Knaut (1656–1716), doctor, botanist and librarian
 Andreas Libavius (1550-1616), practised alchemy, wrote the book Alchemia, a chemistry textbook
 Felix Jacob Marchand (1846–1928) a German pathologist, coined the term atherosclerosis 
 Leonhard Sohncke (1842–1897), mathematician and professor of physics
 Georg Wilhelm Steller (1709–1746), a botanist, zoologist, physician and explorer of Siberia, Kamchatka and Alaska
 Charles Tanford (1921–2009), American protein chemist, born in Halle as Karl Tannenbaum
 Christian Friedrich von Völkner (1728–1796), German translator and historian in Russia

Arts 

 Conny Bauer (born 1943) & Johannes Bauer (1954–2016) jazz trombonists.
 Johann Friedrich Bause (1738–1814) a copper engraver; primarily of portraits.
 Ursula Brömme (1931–2001), operatic soprano
 Thuon Burtevitz (born 1973), composer
 Heinrich Andreas Contius (1708–1795) an organ builder in the Baltic States
 Susanne Daubner (born 1962), German news and television presenter
 Lyonel Feininger (1871–1956), painter of several famous images in Halle, incl. Der Dom in Halle.
 Ernst Flügel (1844—1912) a German Romantic composer.
 Robert Franz (1815–1892) a German composer, mainly of lieder.
 Moritz Goetze (born 1964), pop-artist, painter, sculptor, born and lives in Halle
 Georg Friedrich Händel (1685–1759), Baroque composer, born and raised in Halle.
 Carola Helbing-Erben (born 1952), textile artist
 Claire Heliot (1866–1953) a German lion tamer.
 Johann Georg Ludwig Hesekiel (1819–1874), author and journalist.
 Nickel Hoffmann (1536–1592), mastermason, worked over 30 years in Halle, including the Market Church and the Composanto
 Thomas Kesselhut (born 1991), Twitch streamer and YouTuber, born and raised in Halle
 August Lafontaine (1758–1831), a writer of sentimental novels, then hugely popular, died in Halle
 Georg Listing (born 1987), bassist from the Magdeburg-based band, Tokio Hotel
 Johann Friedrich Naue (1787–1858), classical composer
 Ursula Noack (1918–1988) a cabaret artiste, film and stage actress and chanson singer
 Kai Pflaume (born 1967), German television presenter, born in Halle
 Johann Friedrich Reichardt (1752–1814), composer, writer and music critic, lived in Halle. He was a close friend of Johann Wolfgang von Goethe
 Samuel Scheidt (1587–1654), Baroque composer and organist, spent most of his life in Halle
 Hellmut Schnackenburg (1902–1974), conductor
 Daniel Gottlob Türk (1756–1813), classical composer, was born in Halle in 1750, and was a professor at the University of Halle
 Anja Daniela Wagner (born 1969), operatic mezzo-soprano
 Paul Weigel (1867–1951) a German-American actor, appearing in over 110 films between 1916 and 1945.

Sport 

 Bernd Bransch (1944–2022) a footballer with 317 club caps and 64 for East Germany
 Waldemar Cierpinski (born 1950), East German athlete and twice Olympic Champion, lives in Halle
 Fritz Huschke von Hanstein (1911–1996) a German racing driver, worked for Porsche
 Yoan Pablo Hernández (born 1984), Cruiserweight boxing champion (immigrated from Cuba)
 Marita Lange (born 1943), shot putter, silver medallist at the 1968 Summer Olympics
 Lothar Milde (born 1934) East German discus thrower, silver medallist at the 1968 Summer Olympics
 Jochen Pietzsch (born 1963) a former East German luger, he won gold in at the 1988 Winter Olympics and bronze in 1984.
 Conny Pohlers (born 1978) a German former footballer with 67 caps with Germany women
 Torsten Spanneberg (born 1975) an team bronze medal winner in the 4×100 m medley relay at the 2000 Summer Olympics
 Andreas Wank (born 1988), German ski jumper, team gold medallist at the 2014 Winter Olympics
 Ulrich Wehling (born 1952) a retired German skier who won the nordic combined event in the Winter Olympics three consecutive times, in 1972, 1976, and 1980. 
 Dariusz Wosz (born 1969) a German football coach and former player with 563 club caps and 17 for Germany

Twin towns – sister cities

Halle is twinned with:

 Oulu, Finland (1968)
 Linz, Austria (1975)
 Grenoble, France (1976)
 Ufa, Russia (1977)
 Karlsruhe, Germany (1987)
 Jiaxing, China (2009)
 Savannah, United States (2011)
 Gyumri, Armenia (2020)

Friendly cities
Halle also has friendly relations with:
 Coimbra, Portugal (1976)
 Hildesheim, Germany (1990)

Around Halle

Nearby towns
Halle (Saale) and Leipzig are the two centres of the Central German Metropolitan Region with more than 2.4 million people.

References

Bibliography

External links

 
Cities in Saxony-Anhalt
Members of the Hanseatic League